Fanini–Seven Up was an Italian professional cycling team that existed from 1984 to 1988.

The team went through several different name changes before being known as Fanini–Seven Up for its final season.

The team was selected to race in five editions of the Giro d'Italia, where they achieved four stage wins as well as the young rider classification in 1988 by Stefano Tomasini.

References

Defunct cycling teams based in Italy
1984 establishments in Italy
1988 disestablishments in Italy
Cycling teams established in 1984
Cycling teams disestablished in 1988